The McKinleys were a Scottish pop duo comprising sisters Sheila (born Shelia Gallacher, 12 December 1941, Little France, Edinburgh, Lothian, Scotland – 16 December 2012) and Jeanette McKinley (born Jeanette Gallacher, 1 September 1948, Little France, Edinburgh). The sisters recorded pop singles such as "Sweet and Tender Romance", which they sang on the TV pop show Ready Steady Go!. They also performed with groups such as The Rolling Stones and The Hollies. 

Sheila was married to Howie Casey, saxophonist and band leader of Howie Casey and the Seniors. She died from cancer on 16 December 2012, aged 71.

Later work
Following the release of their fourth single in 1965, the sisters moved to Germany where they toured as The McKinlay [sic!] Sisters. Jeanette as one-half of a vocal duo called Windows, scored a #1 hit in 1972 with a German language cover of the Mouth & MacNeal song "How Do You Do".

Both sisters provided backing vocals for Paice Ashton Lord's 1977 album Malice in Wonderland. Sheila sang on Ringo Starr's Stop and Smell the Roses and Das erste Mal by Marius Müller-Westernhagen.

Singles
"Someone Cares for Me" (Columbia, 1964)
"When He Comes Along" (Columbia, 1964)
"Sweet and Tender Romance" (Parlophone, 1964)
"Give Him My Love" (Columbia, 1965) written by Donovan
"I Want You" (Fontana, Germany, 1967)
"Wer nicht hören will muss fühlen" (Fontana, 1967)
"Große Katastrophe" (Fontana, 1968)

References

External links
 The McKinleys at allmusic.com
 Howie and Sheila Casey interview at classicbands.com 

Musical groups established in 1962
Musical groups disestablished in 1971
Musical groups from Edinburgh
Scottish musical duos
Sibling musical duos
Scottish pop music groups
Parlophone artists
EMI Records artists
1962 establishments in Scotland